Stradishall is a village and civil parish in West Suffolk in the English county of Suffolk.

The civil parish includes a number of hamlets including Farley Green.

The Royal Air Force operated an airfield near Stradishall, RAF Stradishall, which was operational between 1938 and 1970. The former airfield is now the site of two category C prisons: HMP Highpoint North and HMP Highpoint South. Part of the former airfield remains a MOD training site which is closed to the public. There is a memorial to RAF Stradishall outside Stirling House which was once part of the officers quarters and now is a training unit for the Prison service.  The village has an Anglican church dedicated to St Margaret.

Notable residents
 Adam Evans (Singer), grew up on the Highpoint estate
 Lauri Love, activist and alleged computer system hacker.
 John Reeder, Sr., (1613-1659), of Stradishall, Norfolk, England, Emigrated to America in 1630 on Winthrop's flagship 'the Arabella'; Pioneer; Settled in Massachusetts, Connecticut, and then Newtown, Long Island, New York.

References

External links

St Margaret's church

Villages in Suffolk
Civil parishes in Suffolk
Borough of St Edmundsbury